I Hate Valentine's Day is a 2009 romantic comedy film written and directed by Nia Vardalos. The film stars Vardalos and John Corbett, previously seen together in Vardalos' hit 2002 film My Big Fat Greek Wedding. The film was released on July 3, 2009, by IFC Films.

Plot
Florist Genevieve Gernier (Vardalos) believes that the best way to achieve romantic fulfillment is to never go on more than five dates with the same man. She is forced to reassess her philosophy when she meets Greg Gatlin (Corbett), a restaurateur who moves into her neighborhood.

Cast
Nia Vardalos as Genevieve Gernier
John Corbett as Greg Gatlin
Stephen Guarino as Bill
Amir Arison as Bob
Zoe Kazan as Tammy Greenwood
Gary Wilmes as Cal
Mike Starr as John
Jason Mantzoukas as Brian Blowdell
Judah Friedlander as Dan O'Finn
Rachel Dratch as Kathy Jeemy
Jay O. Sanders as Tim the Delivery Guy
Lynda Gravatt as Rose
Suzanne Shepherd as Edie

Box office
I Hate Valentine's Day was released in the United States on July 3, 2009, in three theaters. The film grossed $5,009 in its opening weekend, a per-screen-average of $1,670. It grossed $3,510,643 as of July 1, 2013.

Reception
Reviews for I Hate Valentine's Day were mostly unfavorable. Based on twenty-one reviews collected at Rotten Tomatoes, the film received a 16% positive rating.

Another review aggregator, Metacritic, gave the film an average score of 17 out of 100, based on thirteen reviews. It is placed among the site's top two hundred films with the worst reviews of all time.

References

External links

2009 films
2009 romantic comedy films
Films shot in New York City
Films with screenplays by Nia Vardalos
Valentine's Day in films
2009 directorial debut films
2000s English-language films
American romantic comedy films
2000s American films